Adam Mendrek (born 14 November 1995) is a Czech badminton player.

Career 
In 2015, he won the men's singles event at the Lithuanian International.

Achievements

BWF International Challenge/Series (2 titles, 7 runners-up) 
Men's singles

Men's doubles

  BWF International Challenge tournament
  BWF International Series tournament
  BWF Future Series tournament

References

External links 
 
 
 Official Website
 

1995 births
Living people
People from Český Těšín
Czech male badminton players
Polish people from Zaolzie
Sportspeople from the Moravian-Silesian Region